The TMG EV P001 is a road-legal electric vehicle developed by Toyota Motorsport GmbH. It is based on a Radical chassis as modified for e-Wolf, with two EVO Electric axial flux motors powered by a  lithium-ceramic battery pack. It was developed originally for a customer in 2010.

In August 2011, driven by Jochen Krumbach, it set a new lap record for an electric vehicle at the Nürburgring Nordschleife of 7mins 47.794secs.

See also
 Toyota TS030 Hybrid

References

Toyota vehicles
Electric sports cars